Der schönste Tag meines Lebens is a 1957 Austrian family drama film directed by Max Neufeld. It stars Michael Ande, Joseph Egger and Paul Hörbiger.

Cast
Michael Ande as Toni
Joseph Egger as Blümel
Paul Hörbiger as Direktor
Paul Bösiger as Kapellmeister Schmidt
Thomas Hörbiger as Kapellmeister Brunner
Ellinor Jensen as Schwester Maria
Richard Eybner as Präfekt Keppler
Vienna Boys' Choir

References

External links
 

1957 films
1950s German-language films
Austrian drama films
Austrian children's films
1957 drama films
Films directed by Max Neufeld
1950s children's films